Robert Reid (born 15 May 1887) was a Scottish footballer who played as a right back for Heart of Midlothian (where he took part in the 1907 Scottish Cup Final), Leith Athletic, Cowdenbeath, Burnley, Huddersfield Town and Southend United.

He served with the Royal Garrison Artillery during World War I, and was awarded the Italian Bronze Medal of Military Valor after the conflict ended.

References

Military personnel from Midlothian
1887 births
Year of death unknown
Scottish footballers
Sportspeople from Midlothian
Association football defenders
English Football League players
Scottish Football League players
Scottish Junior Football Association players
Cowdenbeath F.C. players
Burnley F.C. players
Huddersfield Town A.F.C. players
Southend United F.C. players
1998 deaths
Heart of Midlothian F.C. players
Newtongrange Star F.C. players
Royal Garrison Artillery soldiers
Leith Athletic F.C. players
British Army personnel of World War I
Recipients of the Bronze Medal of Military Valor
Scottish soldiers